Scotogramma is a genus of moths of the family Noctuidae.

Species
 Scotogramma deffessa (Grote, 1880) (alternative spelling Scotogramma defessa)
 Scotogramma densa Smith, 1893 (=Scotogramma megaera Smith, 1899)
 Scotogramma fervida Barnes & McDunnough, 1912
 Scotogramma fieldi Barnes & Benjamin, 1926
 Scotogramma gatei (Smith, 1910)
 Scotogramma harnardi Barnes & Benjamin, 1924
 Scotogramma hirsuta McDunnough, 1938
 Scotogramma mendosica Hampson, 1905
 Scotogramma orida (Smith, 1903)
 Scotogramma ptilodonta (Grote, 1883)
 Scotogramma stretchii H. Edwards, 1887
 Scotogramma submarina (Grote, 1883) (=Scotogramma addenda Barnes & Benjamin, 1924)
 Scotogramma yakima (Smith, 1900)

References
Natural History Museum Lepidoptera genus database
Scotogramma at funet

Hadeninae